

Modern Olympics

Summer Olympics

By games

By sport

By country

See also
Azerbaijan at the Olympics
Iran at the Olympics

References

Azerbaijan at the Olympics
Olympics